Gennadi Petrovich Bogachyov (born March 6, 1945) is a Soviet and Russian theater and cinema actor. In the troupe of the Bolshoi Drama Theater in St. Petersburg since 1969. People's Artist of the RSFSR (1990), laureate of the highest theater prize of Russia Golden Mask (2015).

Biography
He was born on March 6, 1945, in the town of Shatsk, Ryazan Oblast. In 1969 he graduated from the acting faculty of LGITMiK and was admitted to the troupe of the Leningrad  Drama Theater, where he still works. Since the early 1980s he is one of the leading artists of the theater.

Most famous works in  cinema are small but memorable roles of waiter Dima in  film   and Stamford in the first series of the movie series Sherlock Holmes and Dr. Watson.

Is the uncle of the actress .

Selected filmography
 Sherlock Holmes and Dr. Watson (1979)  as Stamford
 Moonzund  (1987) as episode
 Brezhnev (2005) as Nikolai Shchelokov
 The Master and Margarita (2005) as Aloisy Mogarych
 Simple Things (2007) as Psaryov

Awards and honors
Honored Artist of the RSFSR (1982) 
People's Artist of the RSFSR (1990)
 Order of Friendship (2004)
  for Best Acting Ensemble (2012)
 Golden Mask (2015) for Best Supporting Actor
 Order of Honour  (2018)

References

External links

1945 births
Living people
People from Ryazan Oblast
Soviet male film actors
Soviet male television actors
Soviet male stage actors
Russian male film actors
Russian male stage actors
Soviet male voice actors
Russian male voice actors
20th-century Russian male actors
21st-century Russian male actors
Russian State Institute of Performing Arts alumni
Honored Artists of the RSFSR
People's Artists of the RSFSR
Recipients of the Order of Honour (Russia)
Recipients of the Medal of the Order "For Merit to the Fatherland" II class